Makers of Indian Literature is a series of biographical monographs published by Sahitya Akademi, India's National Academy of Letters.

Background
In 1964, the Sahitya Akademi, India's National Academy of Letters,  decided to publish the first in a series of monographs on writers who had made significant contributions to the development of literature in an Indian language. The Sahita Akademi planned to title the series Indian Men of Letters. Among the authors invited to contribute to the series was C. Rajagopalachari, who was asked to write on the ancient Tamil poet Thiruvalluvar. Responding to the request, Rajagopalachari objected to classifying Thiruvalluvar as one of  the "Indian Men of Letters". He felt that the series' title should be changed if rishis and sages such as Valmiki and Tulsidas were to be included. Alternative titles were considered. Eventually, in order to encompass both old and modern writers, from sages and rishis to men of letters, the series was named Makers of Indian Literature.

Krishna Kripalani prepared detailed guidelines for the authors to ensure a measure of uniformity. Each volume was to be of about 80 printed pages, or 30,000 words. They were intended primarily for the general reader who had not necessarily read the work of the writer concerned, and might not be burdened with references and allusions more likely to deter than hold the attention of the target audience. The story of the life and work of the writer concerned was to be told simply and lucidly and in such a manner as to convince the reader of the historic significance of their contribution to Indian literature. The merit of an author's worth and the quality of their work was to be established on the evidence of the totality of their contribution. This was to be assessed in the context of the age in which they had lived and, if possible, in the context of Indian heritage as a whole. Selected passages from works discussed were to be interwoven with the narrative, in order to assist the reader to appreciate the author's style and mode of expression.

Monographs
Within twenty years, 120 monographs, on figures who wrote in 20 languages, were published by the Sahitya Akademi. A total of  250 translated volumes were also published, in 13 languages. The next 20 years saw the publication of a further 531 monographs, on historical figures who wrote in a further 21 languages; as well as 586 translations. Of the 651 monographs published up to 2003, 274 were originally written in English; 96 in Hindi; 51 in Urdu; 41 in Tamil; 28 each in Kashmiri and Maithili; 27 in Kannada; 15 each in Bengali and Rajasthani; 14 each in Marathi and Telugu; 10 in Gujarati; seven in Odia; six each in Malayalam and Sindhi; five in Nepali; four each in Assamese and Dogri; two each in Konkani, Punjabi and Sanskrit. Of the 836 translations, Hindi was the most common, with 151 volumes being translated into it; followed by Tamil, 98; Kannada 76; Telugu 70; and Urdu 63.

List of monographs
The authors included in the series cover a wide range:

Assamese
Krishnakanta Handiqui

Bengali
Jibanananda Das
Kazi Nazrul Islam
Buddhadeva Bose
Bankim Chandra Chatterjee
Manik Bandopadhyay
Tarasankar Banerji
Raja Rammohun Roy
Maharshi Debendranath Tagore
Iswarchandra Vidyasagar

English
Sarojini Naidu
Toru Dutt
Manmohan Ghose
Sri Aurobindo

Gujarati
Shamal
Akho
Dayārām
Dalpatram
Narmadashankar
Mahipatram
Govardhanram
Manilal Dvivedi
Kalapi
Kant
Nanalal
B. K. Thakore
Meghani
Harivallabh Bhayani
C. C. Mehta
Harindra Dave

Hindi
Kabir
Ravidas
Jaishankar Prasad
Premchand
Bharatendu Harischandra

Kannada
Basavesvara
B. M. Srikantayya
Panje Mangesh Rao

Kashmiri
Zinda Kaul

Malayalam
Asan
Ulloor
Vallathol
A.R. Rajaraja Varma
Chandu Menon

Marathi
Jnanadev
Namdev
Dattakavi
Kesavsut
H.N. Apte
Sripad Krishna Kolhatkar
Purushottam Shivaram Rege

Odia
Saraladasa
Radhanath Ray

Punjabi
Baba Farid
Bhai Vir Singh
Giani Gurdit Singh

Rajasthani
Mirabai

Sanskrit
Bhavabhuti
Jayadeva
Bhāsa

Tamil
Ilango Adigal
Kamban
Bharati

Telugu
Vemana
Dr. C.R. Reddy
Veeresalingam

Urdu
Mir Taqi Mir
Ghalib
Nazir Akbarabadi

References

External links
 Selected digitised volumes at Sahitya Akademi
 Makers of Indian Literature at Google books

Indian literature
Monographic series
Sahitya Akademi